End of Summer is a 2017 Chinese film by first-time director Zhou Quan. It made its world premiere in the New Currents section of the 22nd Busan International Film Festival, winning the KNN Award.

Plot 
Fifth-grader Gu Xiaoyang (Rong Zishan) loves soccer and wants to get onto the school's team but his teacher father Jianhua (Zhang Songwen) forbids him from playing believing study is more important.

Cast   
Rong Zishan as Gu Xiaoyang
Ku Pao-ming as Grandpa Cheng
Zhang Songwen as Gu Jianhua
Tan Zhuo as Huifang
Dong Qing as Miss Shen
Zhang Liping

Awards and nominations

References

External links  

2017 films
Chinese drama films